Poop or pooped may refer to:

Informal 
 Feces, the solid or semisolid remains of the food that could not be digested in the small intestine
 To poop, to defecate, to eliminate waste material from the digestive tract via the anus

Other 
 Poop deck, a deck that is the roof of a cabin built in the aft (rear) of the ship
 Pooped, a nautical term, to be swamped by a high, following sea, or to be exhausted
 Poop (constellation) or Puppis, a constellation in the southern sky
 Perl Object-Oriented Persistence (POOP), in computer programming
 Poop: A Natural History of the Unmentionable, a 2004 children's book written by Nicola Davies and illustrated by Neal Layton

See also
Poo (disambiguation)